Skullduggery is the ninth studio album by Canadian-American rock band Steppenwolf. The album was released in May 1976, by Epic Records. It was the third of four released by Epic Records, and the last to feature keyboardist Wayne Cook, who left to join Player in 1977. It is the also the last album to be released simply under the Steppenwolf name before the group rebranded themselves as John Kay & Steppenwolf.

Track listing

Personnel

Steppenwolf
 John Kay – guitar, vocals
 Bobby Cochran – guitar, vocals
 George Biondo – bass guitar, vocals
 Wayne Cook – keyboards
 Jerry Edmonton – art direction, drums, percussion, backing vocals

Technical
 Steppenwolf – producers
 Mike Reese – mastering
 Ed Bannon – engineer
 Lorrie Sullivan – design, photography
 Randy Nicklaus – mixing engineer

References

1976 albums
Steppenwolf (band) albums
Epic Records albums